Dmitriyevsky is a rural locality (a khutor) in Dmitriyevskoye Rural Settlement of Koshekhablsky District, Adygea, Russia. The population of this khutor was 479 as of 2018. There are 9 streets.

Geography 
Dmitriyevsky is located 14 km northwest of Koshekhabl (the district's administrative centre) by road. Druzhba is the nearest rural locality.

References 

Rural localities in Koshekhablsky District